Dilution of precision is an algorithmic trick used to handle difficult problems in hidden line removal, caused when horizontal and vertical edges lie on top of each other due to numerical instability. Numerically, the severity escalates when a CAD model is viewed along the principal axii or when a geometric form is viewed end-on. The trick is to alter the view vector by a small amount, thereby hiding the flaws. Unfortunately, this mathematical modification introduces new issues of its own, namely that the exact nature of the original problem has been destroyed, and visible artifacts of this kludge will continue to haunt the algorithm. One such issue is that edges that were well defined and hidden will now be problematic. Another common issue is that the bottom edges on circles viewed end-on will often become visible and propagate their visibility throughout the problem.

External links
 http://wheger.tripod.com/vhl/vhl.htm

3D computer graphics